Acclarent, Inc. began as a privately held, venture-backed company, and is now a subsidiary of Johnson & Johnson. It is based in Irvine, Orange County, California. Acclarent develops technology for ENT (Ear, Nose and Throat) related illnesses.

History 
Acclarent was founded in 2004. The company has over 300 employees and operates in more than 45 countries. Acclarent’s corporate headquarters are located in the Silicon Valley in Menlo Park, California. Since inception, Acclarent has reported more than $103.5M in funding from its venture partners, New Enterprise Associates (NEA), Versant Ventures, Delphi Ventures, Meritech Capital Partners, and Johnson & Johnson Development Corporation.

Acclarent was founded by Dr. Joshua Makower who currently serves as Acclarent’s Chairman of the Board. William M. Facteau was the company's President and Chief Operating Officer from November 2004 until March 2012.  The company's president is currently Jeff Hopkins.

In May 2005, Acclarent received FDA approval for its Relieva Balloon Sinuplasty technology. The company’s portfolio has more than 40 FDA-approved devices including the Relieva Balloon Sinuplasty systems, comprising the Relieva Ultirra sinus balloon catheters, the Relieva Luma sinus illumination guidewires, the Relieva Vortex which provides deep intra-sinus fluid delivery and strong shear flows to empty sinus contents, and the Cyclops articulating endoscope.

In January 2010, Ethicon Inc., a Johnson & Johnson company, completed the acquisition of Acclarent.

In September 2017, Acclarent received FDA clearance for the Aera balloon, the first ever device to treat chronic eustachian tube dysfunction.

References

External links 
 
 Official USA patient website
 Official UK patient website

Companies based in Menlo Park, California
American companies established in 2004